Ayelén Iara Stepnik (born November 22, 1975) is a retired field hockey player from Argentina who won the silver medal at the 2000 Summer Olympics in Sydney and the bronze medal at the 2004 Summer Olympics in Athens with the National field hockey team. Ayelén  also won the 2002 World Cup, the 2001 Champions Trophy and two Pan American Games.

References

External links
 

1975 births
Living people
Argentine female field hockey players
Las Leonas players
Olympic field hockey players of Argentina
Field hockey players at the 1996 Summer Olympics
Field hockey players at the 2000 Summer Olympics
Field hockey players at the 2004 Summer Olympics
Olympic silver medalists for Argentina
Olympic bronze medalists for Argentina
Argentine people of Polish descent
Olympic medalists in field hockey
Medalists at the 2000 Summer Olympics
Medalists at the 2004 Summer Olympics
Sportspeople from Rosario, Santa Fe
Pan American Games gold medalists for Argentina
Pan American Games medalists in field hockey
Atlètic Terrassa players
Field hockey players at the 1999 Pan American Games
Field hockey players at the 2003 Pan American Games
Medalists at the 1999 Pan American Games
Medalists at the 2003 Pan American Games